Michael Darling (born 3 July 1988), also referred to as  Mitch Darling, is a former Ireland men's field hockey international and Rio 2016 Olympian. Between 2006 and 2018 Darling made 183 appearances and scored 51 goals for Ireland. He was a member of the Ireland team that won the bronze medal at the 2015 Men's EuroHockey Nations Championship. He also represented Ireland at the 2016 Summer Olympics and at the 2018 Men's Hockey World Cup. At club level, Darling has won the Irish Senior Cup with Three Rock Rovers. He also played for Rovers in the Euro Hockey League.

Early years, family and education
Darling is from Sandyford in Dún Laoghaire–Rathdown. He is the son of Dr. Michael Darling and his wife, Fiona. He has three siblings – two brothers,  Jonny and Chris, and a sister, Katie. Darling is married to Erika. He was educated at Rathgar Junior School, where in 2000 he captained the boys field hockey team, and at Wesley College. Between 2006 and 2009 he attended University College Dublin where he became a Bachelor of Civil Law. Between 2011 and 2012 he attended Vrije Universiteit Amsterdam where he completed his Masters in International Business Law. Between 2013 and 2015 he completed his legal studies with the Law Society of Ireland.

Domestic teams

Wesley College
In 2005 Darling scored the only goal in a 1–0 win as Wesley College defeated a St. Andrew's College team featuring Alan Sothern and David Fitzgerald in the Leinster Schools Senior Cup final. He also helped Wesley win the All Ireland Schoolboys Hockey Championship.
After becoming an Ireland international, Darling returned to Wesley as a coach.

Three Rock Rovers
Darling began playing for Three Rock Rovers at under-8 level. Together with Kyle Good, Darling was a member of the Rovers team that won the 2008 All-Ireland Club Championship and played in the 2008–09 Euro Hockey League. Darling was also a member of the Rovers teams that won the Irish Senior Cup in 2013–14, 2017–18 and 2018–19. Between 2017 and 2019 he also helped Rovers win the EY Champions Trophy on three successive occasions. He also played for Rovers in the 2017–18 and 2018–19 Euro Hockey Leagues.

KHC Leuven
During the 2008–09 Euro Hockey League, Darling played for Three Rock Rovers against KHC Leuven. The 2009–10 season subsequently saw him invited to play for the Men's Belgian Hockey League team.

Hoofdklasse
Darling has also played for HC Den Bosch, SCHC and HC Rotterdam in the Hoofdklasse. His teammates at HC Den Bosch included Alan Sothern.

Ireland international
Between 2006 and 2018 Darling made 183 senior appearances and scored 51 goals for Ireland. He made his senior international debut in July 2006 against England at the age of 18. He had previously represented Ireland at Under-18 level. Darling was a member of the Ireland team that won the 2009 Men's EuroHockey Nations Trophy. He also helped Ireland win Men's FIH Hockey World League tournaments in 2012 and 2015. Darling made his 150th senior Ireland appearance at the 2014–15 Men's FIH Hockey World League Semifinals.
He was a member of the Ireland team that won the bronze medal at the 2015 Men's EuroHockey Nations Championship. He also represented Ireland at the 2016 Summer Olympics and at the 2018 Men's Hockey World Cup. He made his last senior appearance for Ireland at the World Cup against England.

Solicitor
Between 2013 and 2018 Darling worked as a trainee solicitor/solicitor with A&L Goodbody. His colleagues at A&L Goodbody included Cecelia Joyce. Since 2018 he has worked for Allied Irish Banks as part of their corporate legal team.

Honours
Ireland
Men's EuroHockey Nations Trophy
Winners: 2009
Men's FIH Hockey World League Round 1
Winners: 2012 Cardiff
Men's FIH Hockey World League Round 2
Winners: 2015 San Diego
Runners up: 2013 New Delhi
Men's Hockey Champions Challenge II 
Runners up: 2009
Men's Field Hockey Olympic Qualifier
Runners up: 2012
Men's Hockey Investec Cup
Runners up: 2014
Three Rock Rovers
Men's Irish Hockey League
Runners Up: 2017–18, 2018–19: 2 
EY Champions Trophy
Winners: 2017, 2018, 2019: 3 
Irish Senior Cup
Winners: 2013–14, 2017–18, 2018–19: 3 
Wesley College
All Ireland Schoolboys Hockey Championship
Winners: ? 
Leinster Schools Senior Cup
Winners: 2005: 2

References

1988 births
Living people
Irish male field hockey players
Ireland international men's field hockey players
Olympic field hockey players of Ireland
Field hockey players at the 2016 Summer Olympics
2018 Men's Hockey World Cup players
Three Rock Rovers Hockey Club players
HC Den Bosch players
SCHC players
HC Rotterdam players
Men's Irish Hockey League players
Men's Hoofdklasse Hockey players
Field hockey players from County Dublin
Male field hockey forwards
Expatriate field hockey players
Irish expatriate sportspeople in the Netherlands
Irish expatriate sportspeople in Belgium
Irish solicitors
Irish field hockey coaches
Sportspeople from Dún Laoghaire–Rathdown
Vrije Universiteit Amsterdam alumni
Alumni of University College Dublin
People educated at Wesley College, Dublin
Men's Belgian Hockey League players
KHC Leuven players